As of January 2023, Air India Express serves 32 destinations — 20 in India and 12 international points.

The airline operates flights to one or more foreign destinations from each of these fifteen domestic airports.

Destinations

See also
Air India destinations
Alliance Air destinations

References

Lists of airline destinations